dCMP deaminase (deoxycytidylate deaminase, deoxy-CMP-deaminase, deoxycytidylate aminohydrolase, deoxycytidine monophosphate deaminase, deoxycytidine-5'-phosphate deaminase, deoxycytidine-5'-monophosphate aminohydrolase) is an enzyme which converts deoxycytidylic acid to deoxyuridylic acid.

References

External links 
 

EC 3.5.4